Centerville may refer to:

Centerville, Alameda County, California, now part of Fremont, California
Centerville, Alpine County, California
Centerville, Butte County, California
Centerville, El Dorado County, California
Centerville, Fresno County, California 
Centerville, Humboldt County, California
Centerville, Modoc County, California, now part of California Pines, California
Centerville, Shasta County, California
Centerville, Sierra County, California